Mario Vasilj (born 23 December 1983) is a retired Swedish football defender. He is currently the head coach of Östers IF's U21 team and assistant manager of the club's first team.

Career
He joined Östers IF in 2006 from amateur side Rydaholms GoIF. During his first season at Öster, he was regularly left out of the team for other players, but when he has played, his performances have been impressive considered his lack of experience.

During Östers successful 2010 campaign to win Division 1 Södra, he played every single minute of the season up until the 23rd round, when he tore a PCL. After 12 long years, Vasilj finally left Östers IF after the 2018 season.

Coaching career
After a season with Rydaholms GoIF in 2019, Vasilj decided to retire at the end of the year. On 29 January 2020, he returned to Östers IF as an assistant coach for the first team and head coach of the club's U21 team.

References

External links
 
 

1983 births
Living people
Swedish footballers
Östers IF players
Allsvenskan players
Superettan players
Association football defenders
Swedish football managers
Östers IF non-playing staff